James Beckett (1884 – 19 March 1971) was an Irish water polo player. He competed in the men's tournament at the 1924 Summer Olympics. He was the uncle of Samuel Beckett.

References

External links
 

1884 births
1971 deaths
Irish male water polo players
Olympic water polo players of Ireland
Water polo players at the 1924 Summer Olympics
Place of birth missing
Samuel Beckett